Dichomeris ardesiella is a moth in the family Gelechiidae. It was described by Walsingham in 1911. It is found in Mexico (Veracruz).

The forewings are dark greyish fuscous, with a slight purplish gloss. The extreme costa is very narrowly edged with ochreous as far as the commencement of the costal cilia, where a slight, very pale ochreous shade is projected downward on the wing-surface, apparently indicating the line of a vanished fascia. A minute blackish spot, at the extreme base of the costa, is followed by another, sometimes obsolete, on the cell at one-fifth, and beyond this, in the same line, is another discal spot at two-fifths, followed by another at the end of the cell, from which descends a short, inwardly bowed line of similarly dark scales. There is another dark spot in the fold, below the median discal spot, preceded and followed by a few ochreous scales, of which a very few are also found connected with the two outer discal spots. A few blackish scales occur along the termen before the faintly sub-ochreous base of the smoky grey cilia. The hindwings are smoky dark leaden grey.

References

Moths described in 1911
ardesiella